The Great American Tower at Queen City Square, is a 41-story,  skyscraper in Cincinnati, Ohio which opened in January 2011. The tower was built by Western & Southern Financial Group at a cost of $322 million including $65 million of taxpayer-funded subsidies. Construction on the tower had begun in July 2008.  Half the building is occupied by the headquarters of the Great American Insurance Company. It is currently the third tallest building in the state of Ohio, and the tallest outside of Cleveland.

Background
Western & Southern floated the idea of constructing a tower for twenty years following the last construction boom in Downtown Cincinnati. In 2002 the project was revived. While the Great American Tower is  taller than the Carew Tower, the latter building's roof is  taller than the roof of the Great American Tower. The building was reviewed and approved by the Port of Greater Cincinnati Development Authority which determined whether its parameters conformed to the outline in the Cincinnati 2000 plan for downtown including a final approval by Cincinnati City Council on May 30, 2014.

Tenants in the building include American Financial Group, law firm Frost Brown Todd, law firm Vorys, Sater, Seymore and Pease and Western & Southern Financial Group. As of December 8, 2012, the tower itself is 90 percent leased.

The majority of Western & Southern's space is located in the 303 Broadway portion of the complex.

Design
The building's architect, Gyo Obata, designed the building to include a top inspired by Diana, Princess of Wales's tiara. Gyo was flipping through books when he came upon a picture of Diana wearing a crown. "That's perfect. Here we have the crown of the building, and the nickname for the city is Queen City," said Joe Robertson of Hellmuth, Obata and Kassabaum remarking to Gyo when he first saw the picture. The building is constructed of glass and aluminum. The ground floor lobby interiors were designed by FRCH Design Worldwide. It has met with approval from Sue Ann Painter, author of Architecture in Cincinnati (Ohio University Press, 2006), who believes the skyscraper's headdress recalls the iconic Chrysler Building. She says that the building is somewhat conservative, but pays homage to the other skyscrapers in Cincinnati. Jay Chatterjee, a former dean of the University of Cincinnati College of Design, Architecture, Art, and Planning says that the design is similar to buildings constructed in the United States during the 1980s, that it does not break any new ground at all.

References

External links
Queen City Square
Queen City Square at Building Cincinnati
Queen City Square at UrbanUp

Office buildings completed in 2011
Skyscraper office buildings in Cincinnati
Insurance company headquarters in the United States
Postmodern architecture in the United States
2011 establishments in Ohio
Gyo Obata buildings